HMS Mohawk was a Tribal-class destroyer of the Royal Navy launched in 1907 and sold for scrap in 1919.

During the First World War she served in the North Sea and the English Channel with the 6th Destroyer Flotilla, being damaged by a mine in 1915 and fighting in the Battle of Dover Strait in 1916.

Construction and design
HMS Mohawk was ordered from J. Samuel White under the 1905–06 shipbuilding programme for the Royal Navy, one of five Tribal class destroyers ordered under that programme. The Tribals derived from a requirement by the First Sea Lord "Jackie" Fisher, for a steam turbine powered, oil-fueled destroyer capable of at least . Armament was specified as three 12 pounder (3 inch, 76 mm) 12 cwt guns and two 18 inch (450 mm) torpedo tubes.

While the Admiralty laid down the basic requirements, the details of the design of individual ships was left to the builders, although the builder's designs did need to be approved by the Director of Naval Construction before orders were placed. This meant that individual ships of the class differed significantly from each other. White's design featured a flush deck and a turtleback forecastle. Six White-Foster boilers fed steam to turbines driving three propeller shafts. The main high-pressure turbine drove the centre shaft, with the outer shafts being fitted with low-pressure turbines, together with cruise and astern turbines. Four funnels were fitted. The ship had a complement of 74 officers and men.

Mohawk was laid down at White's Isle of Wight shipyard on 1 May 1906 and launched on 15 March 1907. Seakeeping was poor, however, with the ship rolling badly, and Mohawk had to be rebuilt with a raised forecastle to give acceptable seakeeping. Mohawk was completed in June 1908. It had been realised during construction that the armament of the Tribals was too light, so it was decided to strengthen the armament of the first five ships, including Mohawk, by adding another two 12-pounder guns. This was done to Mohawk following acceptance by the Royal Navy.

Service
On commissioning, Mohawk joined the other ships of her class in the 1st Destroyer Flotilla of the Home Fleet. She remained part of the 1st Flotilla until 1913, when she transferred to the 4th Destroyer Flotilla, based at Portsmouth.  In October that year, the Tribals were officially designated the F class, and as such the letter "F" was painted on the bows of the class. In February 1914, the Tribals (including Mohawk), whose range was too short for effective open sea operations, were sent to Dover, forming the 6th Destroyer Flotilla.

On the outbreak of the First World War the 6th Flotilla formed the basis of the Dover Patrol. An early duty was escorting the ships carrying the British Expeditionary Force to France. A German submarine attempted to attack Mohawk on 6 October, but the destroyer and the ships she was escorting were unharmed. Several mines were spotted close to Mohawk which struck one. Five of Mohawks crew were killed, and Mohawk was towed back to Dover with her decks almost awash.

On the night of 26/27 October 1916, German torpedo boats of their Flanders Flotilla carried out a large scale raid into the English Channel, hoping to attack the drifters watching the anti-submarine nets of the Dover Barrage, and to sink Allied shipping in the Channel. Mohawk was one of six Tribal-class destroyers waiting at readiness in Dover harbour, and when the Germans attacked the drifters and sank the supporting destroyer , they were ordered to intervene. Nubian and Amazon separately ran into the German 17th Half Flotilla, with Nubian first being badly damaged by a torpedo and Amazon then heavily hit by German shells. The group led by Viking then encountered another German formation, the 18th Half Flotilla. German shells killed four aboard Mohawk and caused her steering to jam, blocking the course of Viking when she attempted to pursue the German torpedo boats, that escaped unharmed.

Mohawk remained with the 6th Flotilla until 3 October 1917, joining the 10th Submarine Flotilla. Mohawk remained part of the 10th Submarine Flotilla at the end of the war on 11 November 1918. She was sold for scrap on 27 May 1919.

Pennant Numbers

Notes

Citations

Bibliography
 
 
 
 
 
 
 
 
 
 

 

Tribal-class destroyers (1905)
Ships built on the Isle of Wight
1907 ships
World War I destroyers of the United Kingdom
Maritime incidents in 1915